Valinskas is a Lithuanian surname. Notable people with the surname include:

 Arūnas Valinskas (b. 1966), Lithuanian showman, TV producer, TV show host and ex-politician
 Marius Valinskas,  Lithuanian basketball player 
 Paulius Valinskas (b. 1995), Lithuanian basketball player for Žalgiris Kaunas

Lithuanian-language surnames